The New Jersey State Park Police patrol and protect the State's 54 parks, forests, recreation areas and 130 natural trust preserves which encompass more than  and are visited by more than 18 million people each year. Their motto is "Protecting New Jersey's Treasures and the people who visit them." All State Park Police Officers are sworn State Law Enforcement Officers who are PTC certified. Officers have statewide jurisdiction, carry weapons and have all of the arrest and law enforcement powers of any police officer in the state. They are dedicated to safeguarding New Jersey's resources 24 hours a day through the prevention of crime, apprehension of criminals, enforcement of criminal and motor vehicle laws of the state, and enforcement of park regulations. State Park Police respond to public safety emergencies and environmental emergencies as well as provide mutual aid assistance to municipal, county, state and federal law enforcement agencies. They use various methods of patrol, including foot, bike, boat, ATV, and motor patrol.

Functions 
Operating under the guises of the New Jersey Division of Parks and Forestry, a child agency of the New Jersey Department of Environmental Protection, NJSPP makes up one of two state law enforcement agencies within the arsenal of the NJDEP. Organized under the administration of the Assistant Commissioner for the Office of Natural and Historic Resources, NJSPP is joined by their counterparts with the New Jersey Division of Fish & Wildlife - Bureau of Law Enforcement which also operates as a child agency of the NJDEP. Noteworthy enough, this section includes the New Jersey Forest Fire Service as well as a myriad of others. Although NJSPP headquarters is located in Trenton, New Jersey, being tasked with such an expansive coverage area, the agency operates stations in each operational district in addition to a myriad of other facilities strategically located around the state.

The New Jersey State Park Police is part of the New Jersey Coastal Evacuation Plan for Cape May, Atlantic, Ocean and Monmouth Counties. They assist with the UASI Region, Urban Areas Security Initiative, which supports select high-threat, high-density urban areas in order to address their unique multi-discipline planning, organization, equipment, training, and exercise needs in building and sustaining capabilities to prevent, protect against, respond to, and recover from threats or acts of terrorism. Additionally, they assist the County Prosecutors Offices in all 21 New Jersey Counties with their Child Abduction Response Teams (CART), providing All-Terrain Vehicles and K-9 Units for searches.

Another unique function of this agency lies within the deployability of its K9 section. Established in 2008, the K-9 contingent has grown significantly and now consists of multiple breeds. While the primary purpose of the unit is to provide coverage and service to the organizations needs, they are available 24/7 to assist other agencies in need of a dog. These officers and their animal counterparts are available for searches of lost, missing, or wanted people, explosives detection, narcotics detection, and routine patrol responsibilities. Even more significant though is the fact that the agency also has 1 of only 3 police cadaver dogs in the entire state. These dogs are highly trained to track down the scent of decomposing human remains making them one of the highest requested resources.

Department organization

Trenton Headquarters 

 Chief of Police
 Operations Commander
Internal Affairs Office
Information Technology Office
 Administrative & Business Services Section
Finance & Grant Unit
Records Unit
Personnel Unit (Recruitment / Retention) 
Community Policing & Social Outreach Section

State Park Police Training Center 

 Training Commander
 Training & Education Unit
Officer Trainee Auxiliary Police Academy

Patrol Operations

Patrol Areas 
District 1: Southern Region
District 2: Central Region
District 3: Northern Region

Operations Section 

 Patrol Services
Targeted Enforcement
Special Operations Group
 Emergency Management Office
 Investigations Bureau
Environmental Crimes Unit
 K9 Unit (patrol, narcotics, explosives, and cadaver)

Communications Division 

Staffed 24/7 by dispatchers of the NJDEP Bureau of Emergency Management in a dispatch center accompanied alongside dispatchers from State Police. Referred to as "Trenton Dispatch" the men and women at the DEP Communications Center answer emergency and non-emergency calls from the public requiring a police response in addition to those made to the department's Hot Line number to reporting an environmental emergency: 1 (877) WARN-DEP and also a few others. The center responds to over 50,000 calls every year from the public as well as government and professional agents. Calls to the center are received and evaluated before being forwarded to the appropriate department for action. Given the broad range of the department's responsibilities, a call may be anything from a report of distressed or nuisance wildlife or a lost hiker, to a toxic chemical spill, a forest fire, industrial accident or terrorist event.

In addition to managing the department's 24 phone lines, the communication center also operates and maintains the department's state wide radio network. With radio coverage from High Point to Cape May, the communications center, can directly communicate with the department's field personnel anywhere in the state to support their mission. By doing so they support and dispatch the activities of the NJ State Park Police and Conservation officers. The center's operators are the primary contact for these law enforcement officers on patrol throughout the state, and provide motor vehicle lookups, as well as federal, state and local information checks as needed. The center also handles the activities of the Forest Fire Service and State Hazmat Response Personnel.

External links

State law enforcement agencies of New Jersey
State parks of New Jersey
Trenton, New Jersey
Park police departments of the United States
Specialist police departments of New Jersey